Yadav Shivram Mahajan (22 November 1911 – 27 August 2001) was an Indian politician who was a member of the Lok Sabha from  the Buldhana constituency of Maharashtra elected in 1970 by-elections. He was a member of the Indian National Congress (INC) political party.

Mahajan was born on 22 November 1911. He was educated at London School of Economics and the Middle Temple, London. He was married to Mrs Sarojini and had 2 sons and 1 daughter and resides at Jalgaon.

Mahajan was elected to the 4th and 5th Lok Sabha from Buldhan, and to 7th, 8th and 9th Lok Sabha from Jalgaon.

Mahajan worked as Member of District Congress Committee for 5 years and Executive Member of  Pradesh Congress Committee of  Maharashtra for 2 years 

Mahajan died in Jalgaon, Maharashtra on 27 August 2001, at the age of 90.

Major works
 Industrialisation of Karnataka
 Studies in Agricultural Production and Family Planning

References

External links
 Official biographical sketch in Parliament of India website

1911 births
2001 deaths
People from Maharashtra
India MPs 1967–1970
India MPs 1971–1977
India MPs 1980–1984
India MPs 1984–1989
India MPs 1989–1991
Marathi politicians
People from Buldhana district
People from Jalgaon
People from Jalgaon district
Lok Sabha members from Maharashtra
Indian National Congress politicians from Maharashtra